Malik ibn Nuwayra (: died 632), was the chief of the Banu Yarbu, a clan of the Banu Hanzala, a large section of the powerful tribe of Bani Tamim which inhabited the north-eastern region of Arabia, between Bahrain and Najd. The tribe was pagan until Islam came to Arabia. The center of Malik's clan was Butah.

Muhammad appointed Malik as an officer over the clan of Banu Yarbu. His main responsibility was the collection of taxes and their dispatch to Madinah. Following the Islamic prophet's death in 632.

Biography 

Following the Islamic prophet's death, Malik stopping passing the tax, and also refused to give his tax to Medina.

The Rashidun general Khalid ibn al-Walid and his army encountered Malik and eleven of his clansmen from the Yarbu in 632. The Yarbu did not resist, proclaimed their Muslim faith even after being proven guilty and were escorted to Khalid's camp. Khalid had them all executed for their hypocritical acts and the death of hundreds of muslims. Who had been among the captors of the tribesmen and argued for the captives' inviolability due to their testaments as Muslims. After that, Khalid married Malik's widow Layla who has been a strong witness of Malik's treason and had been against her husband ever since he joined the proclaimed prophetess from her tribe. Layla married Khalid after her Iddat was completed and Abu Bakr himself confirmed it from his messenger. Following that, Layla had been the most supportive wife of Khalid and even reached battles with him since Layla and Khalid had a strong bond over their lifespan. When news of Khalid's decision reached Medina, Umar, who had become Abu Bakr's chief aide, pressed for Khalid to be punished or relieved of command due to misconceptions, but Abu Bakr pardoned him stating that Khalid did nothing wrong and there proofs against Malik that strongly proved his treason. Abu Bakr acted in the same way as the prophet Muhammad did when Khalid might have attacked the Banu Banu Jadhima and killed their men. Muhammad did not discharge or punish Khalid in this incident.

Watt considers accounts about the Yarbu during the Ridda Wars in general to be "obscure". In the view of the modern historian Ella Landau-Tasseron, "the truth behind Malik's career and death will remain buried under a heap of conflicting traditions" Ali and Umar criticized Malik for his actions.

Although some people such as Abu Qutada and 'Umar condemned this act of Khalid and 'Umar called for his stoning due to misconceptions but was cleared upon receiving the messages, but Abu Bakr did not punish Khalid and said that he had made no bigger mistake to be punished for and that he won't sheathe the sword of Allah as Malik reaped what he sowed.

References

Bibliography 

6th-century births
7th-century deaths
7th-century Arabs
Year of birth missing
Year of death missing
People of the Ridda Wars